Koukou Angarana Airport  is a public use airport located near Koukou Angarana, Sila, Chad.

See also
List of airports in Chad

References

External links 
 Airport record for Koukou Angarana Airport at Landings.com

Airports in Chad
Sila Region